In mathematics, an inner product space (or, rarely, a Hausdorff pre-Hilbert space) is a real vector space or a complex vector space with an operation called an inner product. Inner products allow formal definitions of intuitive geometric notions, such as lengths, angles, and orthogonality (zero inner product) of vectors. Inner product spaces generalize Euclidean vector spaces, in which the inner product is the dot product or scalar product of Cartesian coordinates. Inner product spaces of infinite dimension are widely used in functional analysis. Inner product spaces over the field of complex numbers are sometimes referred to as unitary spaces. The first usage of the concept of a vector space with an inner product is due to Giuseppe Peano, in 1898.

If this normed space is also complete (that is, a Banach space) then the inner product space is a Hilbert space.

Definition 
A bar over an expression representing a scalar denotes the complex conjugate of this scalar. A zero vector is denoted  for distinguishing it from the scalar .

An inner product space is a vector space  over the field  together with an inner product, that is a map

that satisfies the following three properties for all vectors  and all scalars 

 Conjugate symmetry:  As  if and only if  is real, conjugate symmetry implies that  is always a real number.
 Linearity in the first argument: 
 Positive-definiteness: if  is not zero, then  (conjugate symmetry implies that  is real).

If the positive-definiteness condition is replaced by merely requiring that  for all , then one obtains the definition of positive semi-definite Hermitian form. A positive semi-definite Hermitian form  is an inner product if and only if for all x, if  then x = 0.

Basic properties 

 is real and nonnegative.
 if and only if 
This implies that an inner product is a sesquilinear form.
 where denotes the real part of its argument.

Over , conjugate-symmetry reduces to symmetry, and sesquilinearity reduces to bilinearity. Hence an inner product on a real vector space is a positive-definite symmetric bilinear form. The binomial expansion of a square becomes

Convention variant 

Some authors, especially in physics and matrix algebra, prefer to define inner products and sesquilinear forms with linearity in the second argument rather than the first. Then the first argument becomes conjugate linear, rather than the second. Bra-ket notation in QM also uses slightly different notation, i.e. , where .

Notation 

Several notations are used for inner products, including 
, 
,
 and
, as well as the usual dot product.

Some examples

Real and complex numbers

The real numbers  are a vector space over  that becomes an inner product space with arithmetic multiplication as its inner product:

The complex numbers  are a vector space over  that becomes an inner product space with the inner product
 
Unlike with the real numbers, the assignment  does  define a complex inner product on

Euclidean vector space

More generally, the real -space  with the dot product is an inner product space, an example of a Euclidean vector space.

where  is the transpose of 

A function  is an inner product on  if and only if there exists a symmetric positive-definite matrix  such that  for all  If  is the identity matrix then  is the dot product.
 

Complex coordinate space

It is a weighted-sum version of the dot product with positive weights—up to an orthogonal transformation.

Hilbert space

The article on Hilbert spaces has several examples of inner product spaces, wherein the metric induced by the inner product yields a complete metric space.

This space is not complete; consider for example, for the interval  the sequence of continuous "step" functions,  defined by:

This sequence is a Cauchy sequence for the norm induced by the preceding inner product, which does not converge to a  function.

Random variables

For real random variables  and  the expected value of their product

is an inner product. In this case,  if and only if  (that is,  almost surely), where  denotes the probability of the event. This definition of expectation as inner product can be extended to random vectors as well.

Complex matrices

The inner product for complex square matrices of the same size is the Frobenius inner product . Since trace and transposition are linear and the conjugation is on the second matrix, it is a sesquilinear operator. We further get Hermitian symmetry by, 

Finally, since for  nonzero, we get that the Frobenius inner product is positive definite too, and so is an inner product.

Vector spaces with forms

On an inner product space, or more generally a vector space with a nondegenerate form (hence an isomorphism ), vectors can be sent to covectors (in coordinates, via transpose), so that one can take the inner product and outer product of two vectors—not simply of a vector and a covector.

Basic results, terminology, and definitions

Norm properties 

Every inner product space induces a norm, called its , that is defined by
 
With this norm, every inner product space becomes a normed vector space. 

So, every general property of normed vector spaces applies to inner product spaces. 
In particular, one has the following properties:

Orthogonality

Real and complex parts of inner products

The polarization identity shows that the real part of the inner product is

If  is a real vector space then

Assume for the rest of this section that  is a complex vector space.
The polarization identity for complex vector spaces shows that

The last equality is similar to the formula expressing a linear functional in terms of its real part. 

These formulas show that every complex inner product is completely determined by its real part. Moreover, this real part defines an inner product on  considered as a real vector space. There is thus a one-to-one correspondence between complex inner products on a complex vector space  and real inner products on  

For example, suppose that  for some integer  When  is considered as a real vector space in the usual way (meaning that it is identified with the dimensional real vector space  with each  identified with ), then the dot product  defines a real inner product on this space.

Real vs. complex inner products

Let  denote  considered as a vector space over the real numbers rather than complex numbers.
The real part of the complex inner product  is the map  which necessarily forms a real inner product on the real vector space  Every inner product on a real vector space is a bilinear and symmetric map. 

The next examples show that although real and complex inner products have many properties and results in common, they are not entirely interchangeable.
For instance, if  then  but the next example shows that the converse is in general  true.
For the complex inner product,  whereas for the real inner product the value is always 

Suppose that  has the inner product  mentioned above.

Orthonormal sequences

Let  be a finite dimensional inner product space of dimension  Recall that every basis of  consists of exactly  linearly independent vectors. Using the Gram–Schmidt process we may start with an arbitrary basis and transform it into an orthonormal basis. That is, into a basis in which all the elements are orthogonal and have unit norm.

This definition of orthonormal basis generalizes to the case of infinite-dimensional inner product spaces in the following way. Let  be any inner product space. Then a collection

Using an infinite-dimensional analog of the Gram-Schmidt process one may show:

Theorem. Any separable inner product space has an orthonormal basis.

Using the Hausdorff maximal principle and the fact that in a complete inner product space orthogonal projection onto linear subspaces is well-defined, one may also show that

Theorem. Any complete inner product space has an orthonormal basis.

The two previous theorems raise the question of whether all inner product spaces have an orthonormal basis. The answer, it turns out is negative. This is a non-trivial result, and is proved below. The following proof is taken from Halmos's A Hilbert Space Problem Book (see the references).

{| class="toccolours collapsible collapsed" width="90%" style="text-align:left"
!Proof
|-
| Recall that the dimension of an inner product space is the cardinality of a maximal orthonormal system that it contains (by Zorn's lemma it contains at least one, and any two have the same cardinality). An orthonormal basis is certainly a maximal orthonormal system but the converse need not hold in general.

Let  be a Hilbert space of dimension  (for instance).

Let  be a Hilbert space of dimension  (for instance).

|}

Parseval's identity leads immediately to the following theorem:

Theorem. Let  be a separable inner product space and  an orthonormal basis of  Then the map

is an isometric linear map  with a dense image.

This theorem can be regarded as an abstract form of Fourier series, in which an arbitrary orthonormal basis plays the role of the sequence of trigonometric polynomials. Note that the underlying index set can be taken to be any countable set (and in fact any set whatsoever, provided  is defined appropriately, as is explained in the article Hilbert space). In particular, we obtain the following result in the theory of Fourier series:

Theorem. Let  be the inner product space  Then the sequence (indexed on set of all integers) of continuous functions

is an orthonormal basis of the space  with the  inner product. The mapping

is an isometric linear map with dense image.

Orthogonality of the sequence  follows immediately from the fact that if  then

Normality of the sequence is by design, that is, the coefficients are so chosen so that the norm comes out to 1. This is the content of the Weierstrass theorem on the uniform density of trigonometric polynomials.

Operators on inner product spaces

 :  satisfies  for all  A  (resp. an ) is an isometry that is also a linear map (resp. an antilinear map). For inner product spaces, the polarization identity can be used to show that  is an isometry if and only if  for all   All isometries are injective. The Mazur–Ulam theorem establishes that every surjective isometry between two  normed spaces is an affine transformation. Consequently, an isometry  between real inner product spaces is a linear map if and only if  Isometries are morphisms between inner product spaces, and morphisms of real inner product spaces are orthogonal transformations (compare with orthogonal matrix). 
 :  is an isometry which is surjective (and hence bijective). Isometrical isomorphisms are also known as unitary operators (compare with unitary matrix).

From the point of view of inner product space theory, there is no need to distinguish between two spaces which are isometrically isomorphic. The spectral theorem provides a canonical form for symmetric, unitary and more generally normal operators on finite dimensional inner product spaces. A generalization of the spectral theorem holds for continuous normal operators in Hilbert spaces.

Generalizations
Any of the axioms of an inner product may be weakened, yielding generalized notions. The generalizations that are closest to inner products occur where bilinearity and conjugate symmetry are retained, but positive-definiteness is weakened.

Degenerate inner products

If  is a vector space and  a semi-definite sesquilinear form, then the function:

makes sense and satisfies all the properties of norm except that  does not imply  (such a functional is then called a semi-norm). We can produce an inner product space by considering the quotient  The sesquilinear form  factors through 

This construction is used in numerous contexts. The Gelfand–Naimark–Segal construction is a particularly important example of the use of this technique. Another example is the representation of semi-definite kernels on arbitrary sets.

Nondegenerate conjugate symmetric forms

Alternatively, one may require that the pairing be a nondegenerate form, meaning that for all non-zero  there exists some  such that  though  need not equal ; in other words, the induced map to the dual space  is injective. This generalization is important in differential geometry: a manifold whose tangent spaces have an inner product is a Riemannian manifold, while if this is related to nondegenerate conjugate symmetric form the manifold is a pseudo-Riemannian manifold. By Sylvester's law of inertia, just as every inner product is similar to the dot product with positive weights on a set of vectors, every nondegenerate conjugate symmetric form is similar to the dot product with  weights on a set of vectors, and the number of positive and negative weights are called respectively the positive index and negative index. Product of vectors in Minkowski space is an example of indefinite inner product, although, technically speaking, it is not an inner product according to the standard definition above. Minkowski space has four dimensions and indices 3 and 1 (assignment of "+" and "−" to them differs depending on conventions).

Purely algebraic statements (ones that do not use positivity) usually only rely on the nondegeneracy (the injective homomorphism ) and thus hold more generally.

Related products

The term "inner product" is opposed to outer product, which is a slightly more general opposite. The outer product is defined for different dimensions, while the inner product requires the same dimension. In an informal summary: "inner is horizontal times vertical and shrinks down, outer is vertical times horizontal and expands out".

More abstractly, the outer product is the bilinear map  sending a vector and a covector to a rank 1 linear transformation (simple tensor of type (1, 1)), while the inner product is the bilinear evaluation map  given by evaluating a covector on a vector; the order of the domain vector spaces here reflects the covector/vector distinction.

The inner product and outer product should not be confused with the interior product and exterior product, which are instead operations on vector fields and differential forms, or more generally on the exterior algebra.

The inner product is more correctly called a  product in this context, as the nondegenerate quadratic form in question need not be positive definite (need not be an inner product).

See also

 
 
 
 
 
 
 
 
 
 Riemannian manifold

Notes

References

Bibliography

 
 
 
  
  
  
  
  
  
  
 
 Zamani, A.; Moslehian, M.S.; & Frank, M. (2015) "Angle Preserving Mappings", Journal of Analysis and Applications 34: 485 to 500 

Normed spaces
Bilinear forms